Azekah (ʿazēqā) was an ancient town in the Shfela ("lowlands of Judea") guarding the upper reaches of the Valley of Elah, about 26 km (16 mi) northwest of Hebron.

The current tell (ruin) by that name, also known as Tel Azeka (ʿtel azēqā) or Tell Zakariya, has been identified with the biblical Azekah,<ref>{{cite book |last=Aharoni|first=Y. |author-link=Yohanan Aharoni |title=The Land of the Bible: A Historical Geography|edition=2 |publisher=Westminster Press |location=Philadelphia|year=1979|page=431 |language=en|isbn=0664242669 |oclc=6250553}} (original Hebrew edition: 'Land of Israel in Biblical Times - Historical Geography', Bialik Institute, Jerusalem (1962))</ref> dating back to the Canaanite period. Today, the site lies on the purlieu of Britannia Park.

According to Epiphanius of Salamis, the name meant "white" in Hebrew. The tell is pear shaped with the tip pointing northward. Due to its location in the Elah Valley it functioned as one of the main Judahite border cities, sitting on the boundary between the lower and higher Shfela.  Although listed in Joshua 15:35 as being a city in the plain, it is actually partly in the hill country, partly in the plain.

Biblical history

In the Bible, it is said to be one of the places where the Amorite kings were defeated by Joshua, and one of the places their army was destroyed by a hailstorm. It was given to the tribe of Judah. In the time of Saul, the Philistines massed their forces between Sokho and Azekah, putting forth Goliath as their champion. Rehoboam fortified the town in his reign, along with Lachish and other strategic sites. In a clay tablet inscribed in Assyrian script Azekah is mentioned as being a fortified town, during the time of Sennacherib's military excursion in the country. Lachish and Azekah were the last two towns to fall to the Babylonians before the overthrow of Jerusalem itself. It was one of the places re-occupied by the people on the return from the Captivity.

Identification
Although the hill is now widely known as the Tel (ruin) of Azekah, in the early 19th-century the hilltop ruin was known locally by the name of Tell Zakariyeh.Zenger (2008), p. 721 J. Schwartz was the first to identify the hilltop ruin of Tell-Zakariyeh as the site of Azekah on the basis of written sources. Schwartz's view was supported by archaeologist William F. Albright, and by 1953, the Government Naming Committee in Israel had already decided upon giving the name "Tel Azekah" to Khirbet Tall Zakariya.

In 1838, British-American explorer Edward Robinson passed by the site of Tell Zakariyeh, which stood to the left of the modern village bearing the same name (Az-Zakariyya, which was depopulated in 1948 and later settled by the moshav Zekharia). French explorer Victor Guérin thought another "Beit Zecharias" to be the village mentioned in the Book of I Maccabees (6:32), and which he locates further to the east at a place called Beit Zakaria (Beit Skaria),Josephus, Antiquities (Book xii, chapter ix, verse 4) a view also held by C.R. Conder who thought the site of the battle between Judas Maccabeus and the Grecian army was in none other than the more easterly Beit Skaria. C.W.M. van de Velde who visited the site between 1851-1852 held the view that this Tell Zakariya and its adjacent Kefr Zakariya are not the same as Josephus' Beit Zacharia, where Judas Maccabeus engaged the invading Grecian army. The matter, however, remains disputed.

"As for Azekah," Guérin writes, "it has not yet been found with certainty, this name appearing to have disappeared." Scholars believe that the town's old namesake (Azekah) can be seen in its modern-day corruption, "az-Zakariyeh". In contrast, Conder of the Palestine Exploration Fund had strong reservations about connecting the site Tell Zakariya with the biblical Azekah.

In the mosaic layout of the Madaba Map of the 6th century CE (ca. 565 CE), the site is mentioned in conjoined Greek uncials: Το[ποθεσία] του Αγίου Ζαχαρίου, Βεθζαχαρ[ίου]  (= [The] site of St. Zacharias, Beth Zachar[ias]). Epiphanius of Salamis writes that, in his day, Azekah was already called by the Syriac name Ḥǝwarta.Notley, et al. (2005), p. 19, note 47, have noted: "According to his (Epiphanius') formulation, it would seem that he was of the opinion that Hiwarta, which means 'white' (lavan), is the translation of Azekah. About five kilometers to the southeast of Tell Zechariah is a high hill called Tell el-Beida, meaning in Arabic 'white'. In current maps, the site is named Tell Livnin, which means the hill of bricks (livanim), and it is to this that Eusebius (who also wrote about Azekah) most probably referred. 'Azekah' is not 'white', either in Hebrew or in Aramaic. Le-azek in Hebrew means to remove stones, and then the soil appears a bit paler. It therefore appears that Epiphanius, who was born in Beit Zedek, near Eleutheropolis, identified Azekah with Tell el-Beida. Azekah is six kilometers from Eleutheropolis, and Tell Livnin is eight kilometers from there. Epiphanius adapted the new name to the identification by means of an etymological exegesis that has no linguistic basis. At any rate, no settlement existed on Tell Azekah in the Roman-Byzantine period. The early site moved from the high hill to the fields in the plain at the foot of the tell. It may possibly have moved as far as Kh. el-Beida, although this is difficult to accept."

Modern Israeli archaeologists have noted that, because of the existence of an adjacent ruin now known as Khirbet Qeiyafa, and which is situated opposite Socho, not to mention the site's "unusual size and the nature of the fortifications," that there are good grounds to suggest that the site in question may actually point to the biblical Azekah.

Non-Biblical mention
Azekah, known to have been built on a mountain ridge, is mentioned in two sources outside of the Bible. A text from the Assyrian king Sennacherib describes Azekah and its destruction during his military campaign.
(3) […Ashur, my lord, encourage]ed me and against the land of Ju[dah I marched.  In] the course of my campaign, the tribute of the kings of Philistia? I received… 
(4) […with the mig]ht of Ashur, my lord, the province of [Hezek]iah of Judah like [… 
(5) […] the city of Azekah, his stronghold, which is between my [bo]rder and the land of Judah [… 
(6) [like the nest of the eagle? ] located on a mountain ridge, like pointed iron daggers without number reaching high to heaven [… 
(7) [Its walls] were strong and rivaled the highest mountains, to the (mere) sight, as if from the sky [appears its head? … 
(8) [by means of beaten (earth) ra]mps, mighty? battering rams brought near, the work of […], with the attack by foot soldiers, [my] wa[rriors… 
(9) […] they had seen [the approach of my cav]alry and they had heard the roar of the mighty troops of the god Ashur and [their] he[arts] became afraid [… 
(10) [The city Azekah I besieged,] I captured, I carried off its spoil, I destroyed, I devastated, [I burned] with fire…

Azekah is also mentioned in one of the Lachish letters.  Lachish Letter 4 suggests that Azekah was destroyed, as they were no longer visible to the exporter of the letter. Part of the otracon reads:
"And inasmuch as my lord sent to me concerning the matter of Bet Harapid, there is no one there.  And as for Semakyahu, Semayahu took him and brought him up to the city.  And your servant is not sending him there any[more -], but when morning comes round [-].  And may (my lord) be apprised that we are watching for the fire signals of Lachish according to all the signs which my lord has given, because we cannot see Azeqah."

Tell Zakariya
Conder and Kitchener, citing Sozomenus (Rel. Pal., p. 753), mention the non-biblical site of Caphar Zachariah being in the region of Eleutheropolis, and conclude that this would point to the village Zakariya near Tell Zakariya. Theodosius, archdeacon and pilgrim to the Holy Land, produced a Latin map and itinerary of his travels in Palestine, entitled De Situ Terrae Sanctae ca. 518-530, in which he wrote: "De Eleutheropoli usque in locum, ubi iacet sanctus Zacharias, milia VI" [= "From Beit Gubrin, as far as to the place where lies the holy [prophet], Zechariah, there are 6 milestones"]. Israeli archaeologist Yoram Tsafrir has identified this "resting place of the holy Zechariah" with the nearby Arab village of the same name, Az-Zakariyya, north of Beit Gubrin. Tsafrir notes that Theodosius' location corresponds with the "Beth Zechariah" inscribed on the Madaba Map, and which site is placed alongside of Saphitha (now Kh. es-Safi). J. Gildemeister reasons that one can ask whether it (Kefar Zakariah) is the same place that appears in distorted forms (e.g. Beit Zachariah) in other writings. Robinson thought that Zakariyeh, as applied to a village, referred here to the site of the Caphar Zechariæ mentioned by Sozomen in the region of Eleutheropolis. Most scholars point to the other Khirbet Beit Zakariyyah, towards the east (grid 1617.1190), as the burial place of the said Zachariah, having been found there the ruins of a Byzantine church now turned mosque, and which church is thought to be featured in the Madaba Map.

Archaeological findings

PEF researcher, C.W. Wilson, concluded in 1899 that Tell Zakariya was occupied at an early pre-Israelite period, and that it was probably deserted soon after the Roman occupation. The wall which encircles the old ruin shows signs of having been several times rebuilt. In cut and design, the stones appear to have been of Maccabean construction.

PEF surveyors, Conder and Kitchener, described the ruin in their magnum opus, the Survey of Western Palestine, saying that they noted on the south-side of the summit an ancient olive-press, among other ruins.

Excavations by the English archaeologists Frederick J. Bliss and R. A. Stewart Macalister in the period 1897-1900 at Tel Azekah revealed a fortress, water systems, hideout caves used during Bar Kokhba revolt and other antiquities, such as LMLK seals. The principal areas of excavation were on the summit's southwestern extremity, where were found the foundations of three towers; the southeastern corner of the tell, where the fortress was located and built primarily of hewn stones; and at an experimental pit located in the center of the summit. Azekah was one of the first sites excavated in the Holy Land and was excavated under the Palestine Exploration Fund for a period of 17 weeks over the course of three seasons. At the close of their excavation Bliss and Macalister refilled all of their excavation trenches in order to preserve the site. The site is located on the grounds of a Jewish National Fund park, Britannia Park.

In 2008 and 2010, a survey of the site was conducted by Oded Lipschitz, Yuval Gadot, and Shatil Imanuelov, on behalf of Tel-Aviv University's Institute of Archaeology.

The Lautenschläger Azekah Expedition, part of the regional Elah Valley Project, commenced in the summer of 2012. It is directed by Prof. Oded Lipschits of the Institute of Archaeology of Tel Aviv University, together with Dr Yuval Gadot of TAU and with Prof. Manfred Oeming of Heidelberg University. and is a consortium of over a dozen universities from Europe, North America, and Australia. In its first season 300 volunteers worked for six weeks and uncovered walls, installations, and many hundreds of artifacts. As part of the Jewish National Fund park, whenever possible structures will be conserved and displayed to the public.

Further reading
E. Stern, "Azekah," in: The New Encyclopedia of Archaeological Excavations in the Holy Land'', E. Stern (ed.), Israel Exploration Society: Jerusalem 1993, pp. 123–124

References

Bibliography

 

 

 

 
 (from Lipschitz, Tel Azekah 113)

External links

Survey of Western Palestine, Map 16:   IAA, Wikimedia commons  
The Lautenschläger Azekah Expedition- Current website
The Lautenschläger Azekah Expedition

Archaeological sites in Israel
Tells (archaeology)
Canaanite cities
Ancient Jewish settlements of Judaea
Hebrew Bible cities
Biblical geography
Ancient sites in Israel
Valley of Elah
Archaeology of Palestine (region)
Iron Age sites in Israel